Mapping L.A. is a project of the Los Angeles Times, beginning in 2009, to draw boundary lines for 158 cities and unincorporated places within Los Angeles County, California. It identified 114 neighborhoods within the City of Los Angeles and 42 unincorporated areas where the statistics were merged with those of adjacent cities.

History

The project began in February 2009 with the posting online of the first version of boundary lines for 87 Los Angeles neighborhoods. The map was then "redrawn with the help of readers who agreed or disagreed with our initial boundaries." The Times said: "After reviewing this collective knowledge, Times staffers adjusted more than 100 boundaries, eliminated some names and added others."

Sources

The Times''' database editor and the map project's coordinator, Doug Smith, along with researcher Maloy Moore, standardized the neighborhood boundaries "based on historical and anecdotal definitions, civic proclamations and reader commentary." "Thousands of city blocks" were converted "into a complete picture of Los Angeles neighborhoods, with no ambiguities, overlaps or missing pieces."

Scope

The Times said that the Mapping L.A. project became the newspaper's "resource for neighborhood boundaries, demographics, crime and schools." The results as posted are searchable by address and ZIP code or by individual neighborhood. It noted that:

In 2009, there were an estimated 9.8 million residents, up from 9.5 million counted in the 2000 U.S. census, the basis for The Times' demographic analysis for each neighborhood and region. Unlike most other attempts at mapping L.A., this one follows a set of principles intended to make it visually and statistically coherent. It gathers every block of the city into reasonably compact areas leaving no enclaves, gaps, overhangs or ambiguities.

Methodology

The project crafted their neighborhood boundaries by merging together neighboring census tracts. However, census tract boundaries are not always consistent with traditional neighborhood boundaries. As the Times states:

Census tracts are drawn by the U.S. Census Bureau and used for tabulating demographic information, including income and ethnicity. The shapes of the tracts are frequently out of sync with the geographical, historic and socioeconomic associations that define communities. However, by using the tracts as building blocks, The Times was able to compile a statistical profile of communities, something other neighborhood boundaries do not offer.

The Times further stated that after merging tracts, they then adjusted the boundary lines by moving individual city blocks from one census tract to another. That allowed them to adjust the census data in proportion to the relocated block's population. A first draft of 87 neighborhoods was released in February 2009. As the Times received input from their readers, they shifted where the neighborhood boundaries should be nearly 100 times. A final map of 114 neighborhoods was released in June 2009. 

 Objections

Not everyone agreed with the neighborhood boundaries the Times ultimately settled on. Elizabeth Fuller wrote in The Larchmont Buzz that "Many people who live in and represent their neighborhoods in various ways have objected to the Times’ designations for not following city-recognized borders, and for lumping many smaller neighborhoods into larger, more indistinct areas such as “Mid-Wilshire.” 

In 2017, cartographer Eric Brightwell of Pendersleigh and Sons, created a map  that identified 472 neighborhoods (in comparison to Mapping LA's 114 neighborhoods).

Comparing Brightwell's map with the Mapping LA Project, Jenna Chandler, the editor of Curbed Los Angeles, wrote that Brightwell's map of 472 neighborhoods "looks more accurate than the neighborhood maps compiled by the Los Angeles Times."  Additionally,  Elizabeth Fuller of The Larchmont Buzz said that Brightwell's map was a much more fine-grained view of “every L.A. neighborhood.” LAist reporter Tim Loc said that while Mapping L.A. provided "plenty of insightful information about individual neighborhoods...Brightwell takes it to the next level when it comes to breaking down the territories." Of Brightwell's map, Loc noted that Downtown L.A. is parsed out as the Historic Core, Bunker Hill, Skid Row, and Gallery Row among others. Brightwell notes that in the Mapping L.A. Project, Downtown L.A. is just "downtown L.A. and Chinatown; there's no Jewelry District or any of the others."

See also
 List of districts and neighborhoods of Los Angeles

References

Other reading

  Nita Lelyveld, "His L.A. Map Quest: A small-town boy smitten with the city's vastness hand-draws quirky depictions of its neighborhoods," Los Angeles Times,'' June 14, 2012, image 17. Article with some of Eric Brightwell's maps.

External links

Mapping L.A. project at the Los Angeles Times

Geography of Los Angeles County, California
Los Angeles Times